Bereg is a rural locality (a village) in Kisnemskoye Rural Settlement, Vashkinsky District, Vologda Oblast, Russia. The population was 12 as of 2002.

Geography 
Bereg is located 50 km west of Lipin Bor (the district's administrative centre) by road. Domantovo is the nearest rural locality.

References 

Rural localities in Vashkinsky District